Bonham is a city and the county seat of Fannin County, Texas.  The population was 10,408 at the 2020 census. James Bonham (the city's namesake) sought the aid of James Fannin (the county's namesake) at the Battle of the Alamo. Bonham is part of the Texoma region in north Texas and south Oklahoma.

History
Inglish and other acquaintances settled there in the summer of 1837, and the settlement was named "Bois D'Arc". The Congress of the Republic of Texas named the city Bloomington in 1843, but renamed it Bonham in honor of James Butler Bonham, a defender of the Alamo. On February 2, 1848, Bonham was incorporated as a city. A 1936 statue of Bonham by Texas sculptor Allie Tennant is on the courthouse grounds.

After connecting to the Texas and Pacific Railway the city began to grow, and by 1885 there were six churches, three colleges, two public schools, three weekly newspapers, a sawmill, two grain mills, a power plant, and about 2,300 inhabitants. 1890 saw the addition of streetcars, an ice plant, and the opening of the Texas Power and Light Company, the area's utility provider. In 1925 the city was connected to natural gas lines.

In 1898, 1911–1914 and 1921–1922, Bonham hosted minor league baseball. The Bonham Boosters and other Bonham teams played as members of the Class D Texas-Oklahoma League (1911–1914, 1921–1922) and the Independent Southwestern League (1898). Bonham teams featured a different moniker each season. Baseball Hall of Fame member Kid Nichols was Manager of the 1914 Bonham Sliders.

During the Second World War, a training camp and an aviation school for the United States Army Air Forces were in the vicinity of Bonham, as was a prisoner-of-war camp for German soldiers. Parts of the camp, approximately 0.5 miles north of US 82, can still be visited today.

Geography

Climate
Bonham's climate is characterized by hot, humid summers and mild to cool winters. According to the Köppen Climate Classification system, Bonham has a humid subtropical climate, abbreviated "Cfa" on climate maps.

Demographics

2020 census

As of the 2020 United States census, there were 10,408 people, 2,963 households, and 1,696 families residing in the city. The population density was 1,067.1 people per square mile (412.1/km2). There were 3,400 housing units. There were 2,963 households, out of which 28.8% had children under the age of 18 living with them, 41.3% were married couples living together, 15.2% had a female householder with no husband present, and 37% were non-families. 32.1% of all households were made up of individuals, and 32.3% had someone who was 65 years of age or older. The average household size was 2.4 and the average family size was 3.05.

In the city, the population was spread out, with 21% under the age of 19, 9% from 20 to 24, 31% from 25 to 44, 23.5% from 45 to 64, and 15.2% who were 65 years of age or older. The median age was 36 years.

The median income for a household in the city was $43,793, and the median income for a family was $52,334. Males had a median income of $26,035 versus $21,897 for females. The per capita income for the city was $24,874. About 14.9% of the population were below the poverty line.

Education

The city is served by the Bonham Independent School District. The city's high school is Bonham High School.

Grayson County College operated a branch campus in Bonham until 2012.

Infrastructure
Highways in around Bonham include U.S. Route 82, Texas State Highway 78, Texas State Highway 56, and Texas State Highway 121.

Notable people
Homer Blankenship, Major League Baseball pitcher of 1920s
Ted Blankenship, MLB pitcher of 1920s
Charlie Christian, pioneering jazz guitarist
Charlie Cole, photojournalist, known for his photo of the Tank Man during the Tiananmen Square protests of 1989
Roberta Dodd Crawford, lyric soprano and voice instructor
Danny Darwin, Major League Baseball pitcher
Karen Dalton, folk blues singer
John Wesley Hardin, well-known outlaw and gunfighter in late 19th-century Texas
Durwood Keeton, American football player
Kenny Marchant, congressman, Texas 24th District
Joe Melson, BMI Award-winning songwriter for Roy Orbison 
Tom McBride, Major League Baseball outfielder
Roy McMillan, Cincinnati Reds All-Star shortstop
Jerry Moore, former head coach of Appalachian State Mountaineers football team
Joe Morgan, Baseball Hall of Fame second baseman
Sam Rayburn, politician, former Speaker of the U.S. House of Representatives
James Tague, writer and a key witness to the assassination of President John F. Kennedy
B. A. Wilson, NASCAR driver

Notes

References

External links
 City of Bonham official website

 Bills, E. R. "Bonham Eccentric." Texas Obscurities: Stories of the Peculiar, Exceptional & Nefarious. Charleston, SC: The History Press, 2013.

Cities in Texas
Cities in Fannin County, Texas
County seats in Texas
Micropolitan areas of Texas
Populated places established in 1837
1837 establishments in the Republic of Texas